Fritz Lanman (born August 6, 1981) is an American entrepreneur and investor in early-stage technology companies. He led the seed and Series A financings in ClassPass in 2014 and became CEO in 2017. In 2021, ClassPass was acquired by Mindbody Inc., valuing the former at $1 billion. In August 2022, it was announced that Fritz would take over as CEO of MindBody. In addition to his role at ClassPass, he is notable for leading the initial financings of Pinterest, Square, Wish, and Flexport, as well as leading the Microsoft deal team decision to invest $240 million in Facebook in 2007, an investment now worth over $8 billion.

Early life
Lanman is the first of five sons of Dr. Richard Lanman and Alanna Purcell Lanman, born on August 6, 1981. He grew up and attended high school in Los Altos, California where he played football, basketball, and golf. He toured Belgium, Netherlands, Luxembourg, and France with the Main Street Singers in 1999. Lanman attended Yale University, where his family had a history of making large donations, graduating in 2003. Lanman speaks three languages: English, Italian, and Spanish.

Career
Fritz Lanman began his career as a Product Manager at Microsoft. He subsequently rose to become Senior Director, Corporate Strategy, where he worked on several notable deals including Microsoft's $240 million Facebook investment. Lanman was quoted onstage at the Le Web conference in 2010 confirming Microsoft's attempt to acquire Facebook, and positing that Facebook (then valued less than $10 billion) would one day be worth as much as Microsoft (then worth $230 billion). As of 2018, Facebook is worth over $500 billion.

Lanman began angel investing in 2010, with his first investment being Square, Inc. He and his investment partner Hank Vigil, senior vice president of strategy and partnerships of Microsoft Corp, subsequently invested in the seed rounds of notable companies such as Pinterest, Wish, Flexe, EasyPost, inDinero, Cargomatic, Everlane and many other startups.

Leaving Microsoft to become an entrepreneur in 2012, Lanman served as founder and CEO of Livestar, a personalized recommendations app. Livestar was acquired by Pinterest in 2013.

After co-founding the audio technology company Doppler Labs in 2013,  Lanman led the Series A financing for ClassPass and became executive chairman. As of 2016, he was rumored to be running the company alongside founder Payal Kadakia and in an interview with Vanity Fair, Lanman confirmed that ClassPass intended to expand outside of studio fitness with a live video product and non-fitness product called "LifePass". Both ClassPass and Doppler Labs were listed as "Next Billion Dollar Startups" by Forbes in 2016.

In 2017, ClassPass announced Lanman as CEO, swapping roles with Kadakia who became executive chairman. Subsequent to Lanman becoming CEO, Temasek led a $70m Series C financing in the company in June 2017. In an interview on CNBC in May 2017, Lanman confirmed that ClassPass's intention was to eventually IPO, though he gave no definitive timetable. ClassPass is the largest fitness network leading members to fitness studios and classes with over 8,500 partners in 49 cities worldwide. In early 2018, Lanman launched a new ClassPass product, live-streaming studio fitness workouts as an at-home or at-anywhere interactive live video product.

ClassPass attained unicorn status in a $285 million December 2019 financing round setting the company's valuation at over $1 billion. ClassPass currently serves over 30,000 partners, including boutique studios, gyms and wellness providers, in 28 different countries. ClassPass also launched a successful corporate program that allows organizations to subsidize their employees using ClassPass to stay in shape, and has more than 1,000 employers using the platform, including Morgan Stanley, Goldman Sachs, Google and Facebook.

On October 13, 2021, ClassPass was acquired by Mindbody Inc. in an all stock transaction. On August 2, 2022, it was announced that Fritz would become the CEO of Mindbody Inc effective September 3, 2022.

Awards and recognition
In 2015, Fritz Lanman was named "One of the Most Powerful People in Wearables" by Wearables.com as executive chairman for Doppler Labs' "Here Buds" product, "Here". In 2017, Fritz Lanman was named one of Fast Company's "Most Creative People in Business".

See also
 Jack Dorsey
 Noah Kraft
 Jim McKelvey
 Ben Silbermann
 Piotr Szulczewski

References

External links

 ClassPass home page

American technology company founders
21st-century American businesspeople
American investors
Yale University alumni
1981 births
Living people